Au nom des rois is the fifth studio album by French pop singer Jeanne Mas, released in 1992.

Track listing
"Ces hommes" (Jeanne Mas, Piero Calabrese, Roberto Zaneli) – 5:06
"Au nom des rois" (Jeanne Mas, Massimo Calabrese, Piero Calabrese, Roberto Zaneli) – 5:30
"Au secours" (Jeanne Mas, Piero Calabrese, Roberto Zaneli) – 4:46
"Sûre de lui" (Jeanne Mas, Massimo Calabrese, Piero Calabrese, Roberto Zaneli) – 4:35
"Dors bien Margot" (Jeanne Mas, Massimo Calabrese, Piero Calabrese, Roberto Zaneli) – 4:12
"Les yeux androgynes" (Jeanne Mas, Piero Calabrese, Roberto Zaneli) – 4:10
"Vivre libres" (Jeanne Mas, Piero Calabrese, Roberto Zaneli) – 4:17
"A cause de vous" (Jeanne Mas, Piero Calabrese, Roberto Zaneli) – 4:03
"La Terre" (Jeanne Mas, Massimo Calabrese, Piero Calabrese, Roberto Zaneli) – 4:04

1993 re-release
"Aime-moi" (Jeanne Mas) – 3:40
"Vivre libres" (Jeanne Mas, Piero Calabrese, Roberto Zaneli) – 4:17
"Mis à part" (Jeanne Mas) – 4:03
"Les yeux androgynes" (Jeanne Mas, Piero Calabrese, Roberto Zaneli) – 4:10
"Ces hommes" (Jeanne Mas, Piero Calabrese, Roberto Zaneli) – 5:06
"Au nom des rois" (Jeanne Mas, Massimo Calabrese, Piero Calabrese, Roberto Zaneli) – 5:30
"Sens de toi" (Jeanne Mas, Massimo Calabrese, Piero Calabrese, Roberto Zaneli) – 4:35
"Dors bien Margot" (Jeanne Mas, Massimo Calabrese, Piero Calabrese, Roberto Zaneli) – 4:12
"La Terre" (Jeanne Mas, Massimo Calabrese, Piero Calabrese, Roberto Zaneli) – 4:04
"Au secours" (Jeanne Mas, Piero Calabrese, Roberto Zaneli) – 4:46
"Sûre de lui" (Jeanne Mas, Massimo Calabrese, Piero Calabrese, Roberto Zaneli) – 4:35
"A cause de vous" (Jeanne Mas, Piero Calabrese, Roberto Zaneli) – 4:03

Album credits

Personnel
Jeanne Mas – vocals
Michel-Yves Kochmann – guitar
Rémy Sarazin – bass

Production
Producers - Piero Calabrese, Jeanne Mas
Arrangements - Piero Calabrese, Jeanne Mas
Engineer - Marco Lecci, Jean-Louis Maillé, Emmanuel Jankowski
Assistant - Didier Boughey
Mixing - Roland Guillotel
Recorded at Studio Musika (France), Studio AB (France), Studio Pollicino (Italy)

References

External links
 Official site

1992 albums
Jeanne Mas albums